Parksville may refer to:

 Parksville, British Columbia, a city in Canada
Parksville Junction, British Columbia, an unincorporated community in the city
 Parksville, Kentucky, a town in the United States
 Parksville, South Carolina, a town in the United States
 Parksville, New York, United States
 Parksville, Tennessee, United States

See also
Nanaimo-Parksville
Parkville (disambiguation)